The 2005 Gael Linn Cup, the most important representative competition for elite level participants in the women's team field sport of camogie, was won by Munster, who defeated Connacht in the final, played at Ballinteer.

Arrangements
In the tournament at St John's Ballinteer, Munster defeated Leinster 1–12 to 0–2. Connacht defeated Leinster by a point, 2–6 to 1–8. Munster defeated Connacht 3–14 to 2–8 in the final. Senior player of the Tournament was Cork's Anna Geary.

Gael Linn trophy
In the tournament at St John's Ballinteer, Munster defeated Leinster by two points 2–8 to 2–6. Ulster defeated Connacht 3–10 to 0–7. Munster defeated Ulster 1–14 to 2–4 in the final. Player of the Tournament was Clare's Deirdre Murphy.

Final stages

|}

Junior Final

|}

References

External links
 Camogie Association

2005 in camogie
2005